Psalm 73 is the 73rd psalm of the Book of Psalms, beginning in English in the King James Version: "Truly God is good to Israel". In the slightly different numbering system used in the Greek Septuagint and Latin Vulgate translations of the Bible, this psalm is Psalm 72. In Latin, it is known as "Quam bonus Israhel Deus his qui recto sunt corde". Psalm 73 is the opening psalm of Book 3 of the Book of Psalms and the second of the "Psalms of Asaph". It has been categorized as one of the Wisdom Psalms", but some writers are hesitant about using this description because of its "strongly personal tone" and the references in the psalm to the temple (verses 10, his people return here, and 17, the sanctuary of God). The psalm reflects on "the Tragedy of the Wicked, and the Blessedness of Trust in God".

The psalm forms a regular part of Jewish, Catholic, Lutheran, Anglican and other Protestant liturgies. It has been set to music.

Text

King James Version 
 Truly God is good to Israel, even to such as are of a clean heart.
 But as for me, my feet were almost gone; my steps had well nigh slipped.
 For I was envious at the foolish, when I saw the prosperity of the wicked.
 For there are no bands in their death: but their strength is firm.
 They are not in trouble as other men; neither are they plagued like other men.
 Therefore pride compasseth them about as a chain; violence covereth them as a garment.
 Their eyes stand out with fatness: they have more than heart could wish.
 They are corrupt, and speak wickedly concerning oppression: they speak loftily.
 They set their mouth against the heavens, and their tongue walketh through the earth.
 Therefore his people return hither: and waters of a full cup are wrung out to them.
 And they say, How doth God know? and is there knowledge in the most High?
 Behold, these are the ungodly, who prosper in the world; they increase in riches.
 Verily I have cleansed my heart in vain, and washed my hands in innocency.
 For all the day long have I been plagued, and chastened every morning.
 If I say, I will speak thus; behold, I should offend against the generation of thy children.
 When I thought to know this, it was too painful for me;
 Until I went into the sanctuary of God; then understood I their end.
 Surely thou didst set them in slippery places: thou castedst them down into destruction.
 How are they brought into desolation, as in a moment! they are utterly consumed with terrors.
 As a dream when one awaketh; so, O Lord, when thou awakest, thou shalt despise their image.
 Thus my heart was grieved, and I was pricked in my reins.
 So foolish was I, and ignorant: I was as a beast before thee.
 Nevertheless I am continually with thee: thou hast holden me by my right hand.
 Thou shalt guide me with thy counsel, and afterward receive me to glory.
 Whom have I in heaven but thee? and there is none upon earth that I desire beside thee.
 My flesh and my heart faileth: but God is the strength of my heart, and my portion for ever.
 For, lo, they that are far from thee shall perish: thou hast destroyed all them that go a whoring from thee.
 But it is good for me to draw near to God: I have put my trust in the Lord GOD, that I may declare all thy works.

Verse 1 
Truly God is good to Israel, To such as are pure in heart.
It is also possible to render the opening words, with a marginal note in the Revised Version, as "Only good is God". However, Alexander Kirkpatrick, who makes this observation, argues that "Surely God is good ..." is the preferred form of words. He suggests that these words represent "the conclusion to which [the Psalmist] had been led through the trial of his faith".

Assessment
In the opinion of Walter Brueggemann (1984), "in the canonical structuring of the Psalter, Psalm 73 stands at its center in a crucial role. Even if the Psalm is not literarily in the center, I propose that it is centre theologically as well as canonically".

This was the favourite psalm of Martin Buber, who said about it: "What is it that so draws me to this poem that is pieced together out of description, report and confession, and draws me ever more strongly the older I become? I think it is this, that here a person reports how he attained to the true sense of his life experience and that this sense touches directly on the eternal."

Usage 
In the Church of England's Book of Common Prayer, this psalm is appointed to be read on the evening of the fourteenth day of the month.

Musical settings 
Heinrich Schütz set Psalm 73 in a metred version in German, "Dennoch hat Israel zum Trost", SWV 170, as part of the Becker Psalter, first published in 1628.

References

External links 

 
 
  in Hebrew and English, Mechon-mamre
 Text of Psalm 73 according to the 1928 Psalter
 A psalm of Asaph. How good God is to the upright, to those who are pure of heart! (text and footnotes) United States Conference of Catholic Bishops
 Psalm 73 – "My Feet Almost Slipped" (text and detailed commentary) enduringword.com
 Psalm 73:1 (introduction and text) Bible study tools
 Psalm 73/ Refrain: In the Lord God have I made my refuge. Church of England
 Psalm 73 Bible gateway
 Charles H. Spurgeon: Psalm 73 (commentary) spurgeon.org

073